Curtis Lee Anderson (born May 16, 1957) is a former American football defensive end in the National Football League for the Kansas City Chiefs and Green Bay Packers. He also was a member of the Michigan Panthers, Oklahoma Outlaws and Jacksonville Bulls in the United States Football League. He played college football at Central State University.

Early years
Anderson attended Withrow High School. He accepted a football scholarship from Central State University. He was a three-year starter at defensive end and also played defensive tackle occasionally in a five-man defensive line.

He led the team in sacks and tied for the lead in interceptions in his last 3 seasons. As a junior, he had 12 sacks in 10 games. As a senior, he registered 7 sacks in 9 games.

In 2011, he was inducted into the Central State University Athletic Hall of Fame.

Professional career
Anderson was selected by the Dallas Cowboys in the 5th round (128th overall) of the 1979 NFL Draft. He was waived on August 18.

On October 9, 1979, he was signed as a free agent by the Kansas City Chiefs to replace an injured Mike Bell. He was released on July 21, 1980.

In 1980, he signed with the Ottawa Rough Riders of the Canadian Football League. He was released on June 29, 1981.

On November 23, 1982, he was signed by the Michigan Panthers of the United States Football League. In 1983, he played only 3 games (2 starts) because of a hand injury, for a team that would become the USFL champion. He was selected by the Oklahoma Outlaws in the first round of the United States Football League expansion draft at the end of the season.

In 1984, he led the Outlaws in sacks with 11. At the end of the season, the league consolidated from 18 to 14 teams and Anderson was allocated to the Jacksonville Bulls. In 1985, he had 3 sacks. The league folded in 1986.

On July 23, 1986, he signed with the Minnesota Vikings. He left training camp on August 2.

On July 14, 1987, he was signed by the St. Louis Cardinals. He was released on August 2. After the NFLPA strike was declared on the third week of the season, those contests were canceled (reducing the 16 game season to 15) and the NFL decided that the games would be played with replacement players. In September, he was signed to be a part of the Green Bay Packers replacement team. He was released at the end of the strike.

References

External links
Central State Hall of Fame bio

1957 births
Living people
Players of Canadian football from Cincinnati
Players of American football from Cincinnati
American football defensive ends
Central State Marauders football players
Kansas City Chiefs players
Ottawa Rough Riders players
Michigan Panthers players
Oklahoma Outlaws players
Jacksonville Bulls players
Green Bay Packers players
National Football League replacement players